The Mortuaries Act 1529 (21 Hen 8 c 6) was an Act of the Parliament of England.

The whole Act was repealed by section 87 of, and Schedule 5 to, the Ecclesiastical Jurisdiction Measure 1963 (No 1).

Section 1
In this section, the words of commencement and the words "of det by writ byll plaint" were repealed by section 1 of, and Schedule 1 to, the Statute Law Revision Act 1948.

References
Halsbury's Statutes,

Acts of the Parliament of England (1485–1603)
1529 in law
1529 in England